A Cyzicene hall is the architectural term derived from the Latin word cyzicenus given by Vitruvius to the large hall used by the Greeks that faced north, with a prospect towards the gardens; the windows of this hall opened down to the ground, so that the green verdure could be seen by those lying on the couches. A Cyzicene hall is similar to the Roman triclinium, although much larger.

References

Sturgis, Russel. " Cyzicene Hall" in A Dictionary of Architecture and Building, Biographical, Historical, . . . MacMillan Co., 1901, pp. 738–739.

Rooms
Passive cooling